Alter Ego is a German music group, comprising Roman Flügel and Jörn Elling Wuttke. They achieved notability in 2004 with their track "Rocker", which became one of the year's defining dance anthems, especially in Europe, and getting played on rotation amongst the most popular DJs such as Felix Da Housecat, 2 Many DJs and The Chemical Brothers. The track peaked at #32 in the UK Singles Chart.

In the 2004 Groove Magazine Readers Poll, Alter Ego won three categories, taking out the award for 'Best Single' for "Rocker", 'Best Album' for Transphormer, and also 'Best Live Act'. French group Black Strobe took out 'Best Remix' honours with their remix of "Rocker".

Though the two remain friends, Alter Ego have not been active since the release of their final album in 2008. In interviews, Flügel suggested that the hiatus occurred because the two simply stopped enjoying working professionally, and following their own projects was the best way of both securing their friendship and keeping their work interesting.

In 2005, Roman Flügel went on to produce the track "Gehts Noch?", which was a worldwide hit, and was regularly played by many international DJs. Since Alter Ego became inactive, Flügel signed to Dial Records and released three full length solo albums so far, along with several EPs released on various other labels and collaborations with like-minded artists such as Simian Mobile Disco and Daniel Avery, who count Flügel's work as inspirations. In contrast to the harsh, electro-house style that made "Rocker" and "Gehts Noch?" successful, Flügel's recent work is inspired chiefly by techno and krautrock.

Selected discography

Albums
 The Lost Album (2012)
 What's Next?! (2008) (remix album)
 Why Not?! (2007)
 Transphormed (2005)
 Transphormer (2004)
 Decoding the Hacker Myth (1996)
 Alterism (1996)
 Memories from Overseas (1995)
 Alter Ego (1994)

Singles
 "Rocker" [Universal CD] (2005) (AUS #91)
 "Rocker" [Ultra 12"] (2005)
 "Betty Ford EP" (2000)
 "Slaughterhouse" (2000)
 "Absolute" (1997)
 "The Evil Needle" (1997)
 "Decoding the Hacker Myth Remixes, Vol. 1" (1996)

Remixes
"Giving You Up" - Kylie Minogue (2005)
 "Suffer Well" - Depeche Mode (2006)
 "Psychological" - Pet Shop Boys (2006)
 "Human After All" - Daft Punk (2006)
 "Trauermusik" - Partial Arts (2007)
 "Hypercommunication" - Poni Hoax (2008)

References

External links
 ongaku.de - Official website
 Alter Ego at Yahoo! Music
 
 

German electronic music groups